Chekka is coastal town located in North Lebanon. It is located north of Râs ach-Chaq’a’ and Herri beaches, or Theoprosopon of classical times and south of the ancient Phoenician port of Enfeh and the city of Tripoli. The origin of the word is believed to be Canaanite from the word Chikitta. Chikitta was mentioned Amarna letters in Egypt as a coastal town situated in the geographical area of modern Chekka. Until now there are no Canaanite archeological findings in Chekka backing this hypothesis. Chekka's modern history is clear. The high land in Chekka now known as Chekka Al-Atika was resettled around 300 years ago and the fertile valley of Chekka was cultivated in the intention of making Chekka a Maronite stronghold on the Lebanese coast. Many families moved from Mount Lebanon to Chekka at that time.

Chekka is rich in freshwater submarine springs. The American University of Beirut's Faculty of Engineering investigated the potential of sustainable exploitation of the Chekka Bay submarine springs in 2000.

Chekka is known for Râs ach-Chaq’a’, a white and green mountain touching the Mediterranean sea and its public and private sand beaches.

Economy
Chekka is home to some of the largest cement and paper factories in the eastern Mediterranean. Companies such as Holcim Liban, Cimenterie Nationale S.A.L and Société Libanaise des Ciments Blancs S.A.L.B, headquartered in Chekka. The ancient process of extracting salt from the sea is still practiced in Chekka but without traditional wind powered water pumps.

Chekka is also an agricultural city, main productions including figs among the others. It is the headquarters of the second largest Lebanese poultry producer with a slaughterhouse, farms, hatcheries and feed mill plant located in it. Chekka is also home to large public and private sand beaches.

The Las Salinas and Florida Beach resorts provide a wide range of nautical and inland activities for which Chekka is best known. Chekka has a range of other hotels and resorts, with more than a 270 chalets, 100 cabins and a marina capable of receiving more than 70 boats.

Education and youth
Chekka is considered as the center for education for the neighboring regions. Public and private schools in Chekka include Sainte Famille Maronite and Les moines libanais private Maronite schools. Université Saint-Esprit de Kaslik has a branch in Chekka for law , business majors and architecture and is currently considering expanding to other fields.

People and diaspora
Today Chekka has a Christian majority mostly Maronite and Greek Orthodox with a very few Sunni Muslims minority . It has many Maronite Christian, Greek Orthodox and Greek Catholic churches.

The Current  maronite archbishop of Tripoli Joseph Soueif was born in Chekka. He was the bishop of the Maronite Catholic Archeparchy of Cyprus till  29 October 2020 .

Around 17,000 people are currently residing in Chekka many of which come originally from villages such as Tannourine, Zgharta and Bcharre. Chekka has a rich diaspora in USA, Australia, Canada, France and the Gulf.

Sports
There are several sports teams that represent Chekka. The Chekka soccer club won the north district soccer championship in 2005-06, and have finished on the podium ever since. There are several other sports clubs in the region such as the Chekka ‘Saint famille’ Basketball club. Speed Ball volleyball club, one of Chekka's most ancient volleyball clubs, was the champion of the Lebanese volleyball three years in a row, 2017 2018 2019, and has represented Lebanese volleyball in Tunisia in 2019.

The team has so many stars from different Lebanese cities, including homegrown players like  Dr Adib Kfoury and Ghassan Fares

Environmental issues
See Noxious liquid substances spills in Chekka region.

References

External links
 Chekka, Localiban

Populated places in the North Governorate
Batroun District
Sunni Muslim communities in Lebanon